The Women's points race at the 2014 Commonwealth Games, as part of the cycling programme, took place on 27 July 2014.

Results

Finals

References

Women's points race
Cycling at the Commonwealth Games – Women's points race
Comm